was a Japanese samurai of the late Sengoku period, the 4th son of , and younger brother of Kurujima Michiyuki. His father was a leader of one of the three Murakami suigun (Murakami navies), major naval powers in the 16th century.  

Masamichi belonged to the army corps in Fukushima Masanori in the Seven-Year War. His brother was killed at the Battle of Dangpo. He was killed in the Battle of Myeongnyang by the forces of Yi Sun-sin. He was the only daimyō who was killed in the action during the war.

Modern culture
 Portrayed by Ryu Seung-ryong in the 2014 film The Admiral: Roaring Currents.

Notes

1562 births
1597 deaths
Japanese warriors killed in battle
Daimyo